Anarchist Communist Youth Association of Narva was a political youth movement in Narva, Estonia, at the time of the October Revolution. It operated under the leadership of anarchists. Political meetings and demonstrations were held by the association. They also established a library, several autonomous groups, a choir and a string orchestra. On the initiative of the Tallinn Social Democratic Youth Association (Tallinn SDNÜ), on February 17, 1918, a congress of all social democratic youth organizations operating in Estonia was convened in Tallinn, where a central all-Estonian youth association was to be established. Their 20 delegates represented more than 2,000 members. The Congress had a heated discussion with the anarchist delegates of Narva, who did not agree that the nationwide organization to be established should adopt a Bolshevik program as the beginning of its activities. However, when the program was adopted by a majority, the representatives of the Narva youth left the congress.

In 2006, anarchistic interactive portal PunaMust is established.

References

History of Narva
Political organizations based in Estonia
Political history of Estonia
Defunct anarchist organizations in Europe
1917 establishments in Estonia
Organizations of the Russian Revolution
Anarchism in Estonia
Youth organizations based in Estonia